The Mess Hall released in 2001, is the first full-length album from the Australian rock band, the Mess Hall. The band's self-titled, lo-fi debut album was described as, "....the perfect soundtrack to trashing a hotel room".

Track listing
 "Dead Field Stomp"
 "Railyard Rumble"
 "Danny Blue-Tongue Blues"
 "Air"
 "Hit Like That in the Ring"
 "Hell Is Just A Bar"
 "Hollerin' Love"
 "Highway Like A Trail"
 "I Feel Like A Dog"
 "Medley"

References

External links
The Mess Hall
www.waterfrontrecords.com

The Mess Hall albums
2001 debut albums
Shock Records albums